Yamaha YZE 750 was a rally raid bike, produced from 1988 to 1991 with the specific task of winning the Dakar Rally, that won 1991 Dakar Rally with French biker Stéphane Peterhansel.

Rally Dakar

See also
 Yamaha XT660Z Ténéré
 Yamaha XT1200Z Super Ténéré

References

External links
 Ténéré - Yamaha Motor Global
 Le Regine della Dakar 

YZE 750
Off-road motorcycles
Motorcycles introduced in 1988
Rally raid bikes